George C. Carlson Jr. is a former justice of the Supreme Court of Mississippi. He served on the court from 2001 to 2013, serving as chief justice for part of that tenure.

Carlson graduated from South Panola High School in 1964, Mississippi State University in 1969, University of Mississippi School of Law in 1972, and National Judicial College at  University of Nevada in Reno in October 1982.

He was appointed to the state supreme court by Governor Ronnie Musgrove, to a seat vacated by the resignation of Michael P. Mills.

See also
List of justices of the Supreme Court of Mississippi

References

Chief Justices of the Mississippi Supreme Court

Year of birth missing (living people)
Living people
Mississippi State University alumni
University of Mississippi School of Law alumni